Halife Altay (1917 – 15 August 2003 in Almaty) was a Kazakh author and anthropologist. He fled the People's Republic of China during the Kazakh exodus from Xinjiang, and later wrote about the migration and about Kazakh culture. He lived in Turkey for a period, and then moved to Kazakhstan.

Works
Halife Altay, Anayurttan Anadoluʹya, Ankara: Kültür Bakanlığı (1981). (Turkish)
Halife Altay, Kazak Türklerine aid şecere, Istanbul (1997) (Turkish)

External links
Page at centrasia.ru  

1917 births
2003 deaths
Writers from Xinjiang
Kazakh-language writers
Chinese emigrants to Turkey
Turkish emigrants to the Soviet Union